The Lenco BearCat is a wheeled SWAT vehicle designed for military and law enforcement use. It is in use by several military forces and law enforcement agencies around the world.

History
Since 1981 the Massachusetts-based Lenco Industries, known as Lenco Armored Vehicles, has designed and manufactured armored vehicles for law enforcement, military, government and private security forces. Lenco has produced more than 5,000 armored vehicles for use in more than 40 countries worldwide.

The BearCat is one type of vehicle produced by the company that is in use by numerous U.S. military and law enforcement agencies and it also used by all state and territory Police Tactical Groups in Australia purchased by the Australian Government. The Bearcat is based on a Ford F-550 Super Duty commercial truck chassis with two available engines (the V10 Triton Gasoline and the 6.7L Turbo Diesel), and a six-speed automatic transmission. The .5-1.5 inch thick mil spec steel armored bodywork is completed with .50 BMG rated ballistic glass capable of multi-hits, blast-resistant floors, gunports, roof hatches/turret and agency specific equipment and/or modifications such as lights/sirens/battering ram/winches/thermal cameras and spot lights.

The first BearCat was designed and completed in August 2001 as a spin-off product of the larger Lenco B.E.A.R., with input from Los Angeles County Sheriff's Department Special Enforcement Bureau (SEB) as an updated and improved version of their military surplus Cadillac Gage Ranger "PeaceKeeper" armored vehicles.

Usage
BearCats are typically referred to by law enforcement agencies as being "armored rescue vehicles" with their primary use being to transport tactical (SWAT/Special Reaction Teams) officers to and from hostile situations and to assist with the recovery and protection of civilians in harm's way during terrorist threats, hostage incidents, or encounters with large gatherings of aggressors. The BearCat is designed to provide protection from a variety of small arms, explosives and IED threats. Like its larger cousin, the B.E.A.R., the BearCat is able to be fitted with the "MARS" Mobile Adjustable Ramp System which allows tactical officers to gain entry to elevated platforms such as second story windows or aircraft.

Lenco BearCats have been credited with saving the lives of officers in armed confrontations on numerous occasions. In 2010 in Athens, Texas, an armed offender fired more than 35 rounds from a semi-automatic AK-74 rifle at tactical police. Not one round penetrated the BearCat. In June 2012 a BearCat, belonging to the Central Bucks Emergency Response Team, took 28 rounds from a "high-powered rifle" during a siege with no rounds penetrating the vehicle. In November 2015, a BearCat was used by police to rescue civilians during the Colorado Springs Planned Parenthood shooting. The Oklahoma County Sheriff's Office BearCat was shot between four and seven times with a rifle during an incident on December 29, 2015. Sheriff Whetsel was quoted as saying the BearCat saved the Deputies' lives. On June 12, 2016, a BearCat was used to breach Pulse nightclub after a gunman shot and killed 49 clubgoers and injured 53 others.

Variants

At present there are nine variants of the BearCat, some with unique features and others designed for specific purposes or customers.

 Military – Military version
 LE – Law enforcement version
 G3 – off-road variant for law enforcement
 VIP/SUV – armored vehicle for diplomatic missions
 Medevac LE – armored medical evacuation vehicle (law enforcement) "MedCat" – equipped with two medical litters, oxygen tanks, a lighted work station, and compartments for medical supplies and gear storage.
 Medevac Mil – armored medical evacuation vehicle (military) "MedCat" – designed for Tactical Combat Casualty Care (TC3), equipped with same features as the MedCat LE with four medical litters.
 Riot control
Edition equipped with anti-riot gear, as shown below.
 Equipped with Hydraulic RAM (Front Plow) to move heavy barriers
 Steel Armor Construction with optional B-Kit & Blast protection
 Gunner Protection Kit with mounts for M249, Mk19, M2 .50 Ca
 Mission-specific floorplan designed for end user requirements
 Protective Window Screens and Light Guards, LRAD, Smoke Launcher
 V8 Turbo Diesel Engine; 4x4 for off-road performance
 Commercial-off-the-shelf (COTS) platform for easy and low-cost maintenance
 G4 M-ATV – armored all-terrain vehicle (Generation 4)
 EOD (Explosive ordnance disposal) – armored vehicle "BombCat" for bomb units with room for a large bomb disposal robot, with fold-down ramp and hydraulically controlled platform for deployment.  Also can include roof-mounted zoom camera with scene lighting, thermal camera, CBRNE equipment, and advanced communications sensors upon request.

Features
The BearCat series is customizable with a variety of non-standard features depending on the customers' requirements. BearCats are able to be fitted with moveable elevated platform systems called the Liberator and ARC by Patriot3, Inc., to enable tactical units to access a variety of elevated structures such as multi-story buildings, ships at docks, or aircraft during high-risk hostage or terrorist situations. The LAPD fits one of its four armoured Lenco vehicles with one such system along with many other local and state law enforcement agencies.

Some of the BearCat's features include:
 emergency lights/sirens
 rotating roof hatch
 optional powered turrets with or without ballistic glass panels and blast shields
 gun ports
 electric winches
 running boards
 protection against chemical, biological, radiological, nuclear, and high-yield explosives (CBRNE)
 back-up camera
 Common Remotely Operated Weapon Station (CROWS)
 battering ram attachment
 CS gas (tear gas) deployment nozzle
 radiation detection systems
 Thermographic camera systems
 spot/flood lights

Operators

BearCats of various configurations are in use by the following agencies and departments around the world with over 500 in use in the United States alone.

 Australian Federal Police – Specialist Response Group
 New South Wales Police Force – Tactical Operations Unit ×3 (One each of the 2003, 2012 and 2018 variant)
 Northern Territory Police – Territory Response Group
 Queensland Police Service – Special Emergency Response Team ×2
 South Australia Police – Special Tasks and Rescue Group
 Tasmania Police – Special Operations Group
 Victoria Police – Special Operations Group ×2 (2018 variant) and Critical Incident Response Team x1 (2013 variant)
 Western Australia Police – Tactical Response Group ×2

 Bangladesh Police
 Bangladesh Ansar
 Border Guard Bangladesh

 Antwerp Local Police

Military Police of Goiás State – Batalhão de Operações Especiais

 Ottawa Police Service – Tactical Unit
 Saskatoon Police Service – Emergency Response Team

 Counter Terrorism Centre

 Moroccan Auxiliary Forces – 88 BearCat armored vehicles in riot control, troop transport, communications, convoy protection, and SWAT variants.
 BCIJ (Bureau Central d'Investigations Judiciaires), Moroccan Domestic Intelligence Unit & Special Forces.

 National Police Corps - Multiple Lenco BEARs and Lenco BearCats in service with the Dienst Speciale Interventies (Special Intervention Service). A  police service consisting of both military and police personnel, specialized in counter-terrorism ops, apprehension of high-value or high-risk individuals, aircraft hijackings and hostage situations. Also includes operators belonging to M-Squadron of NLMARSOF, special operations forces of the Netherlands Marine Corps, under DSI command for domestic counter-terrorism operations on Dutch soil, specialized in large-scale and complex interventions.

 Serbian Armed Forces - Military Police

 National Police Agency (South Korea) - Korea National Police Special Operation Unit

 National Police Agency (Taiwan) - National Police Agency Special Operations Group

Federal Law Enforcement
 Federal Bureau of Investigation – Special Weapons and Tactics
United States Department of Energy Over 80 Lenco BearCats on (8) DoE Sites
 United States Park Police
 Kennedy Space Center – Emergency Response Team

State/Local Law Enforcement
 Alaska State Troopers – 3
 Bergen County Regional SWAT team
 Berrien County Sheriff's Office SWAT
 Bloomington Police Department 
 Boulder County Sheriff
 Burbank Police Department – S.W.A.T
 Central Bucks Emergency Response Team
 Chicago Police Department – S.W.A.T
 Clackamas County Sheriff's Office, CCSO SWAT. Clackamas County, OR x 1 Bearcat 
 Concord, New Hampshire, Police Department 
 Dallas Police Department (Texas) – S.W.A.T x 2
 Denver Police Department – S.W.A.T
 Des Moines Police Department; Des Moines, IA 
 Douglas County (CO) Sheriff -SWAT
Edmond Oklahoma Police Department - SWAT 
 Erie (PA) Bureau of Police
 Honolulu Police Department – Specialized Services Division 
 Hudson County Sheriff's Department – S.W.A.T
 Humboldt County (CA) Sheriff's Department
 Kansas Highway Patrol - Special Response Team and Mobile Field Force
 Keene, New Hampshire Police Department- S.W.A.T.
 Louisiana State Police – S.W.A.T
 Los Angeles County Sheriff's Department – Special Enforcement Bureau ×6 (One B.E.A.R, three BearCats, two Paramedic or MedCats)
 Los Angeles Police Department – S.W.A.T ×4 (One B.E.A.R, two BearCats and one MedCat variant)
 Lower Columbia SWAT, Cowlitz, Clark, Skamania, and Wahkiakum Counties – Washington State.
 Miami Dade Police Department – S.R.T
 Miami-Dade Police Department Special Response Team

Michigan State Police - Emergency Response Team
Montrose County Colorado sheriff department 
St Louis Metro Police Department– S.W.A.T 
 New Mexico State Police – Tactical Team
 New York City Police Department Emergency Service Unit ×2
 Northeast Massachusetts Law Enforcement Council (NEMLEC)
Oakland County Sheriff's Office - S.W.A.T.
 Oklahoma County Sheriff's Office - S.W.A.T.
 Orlando Police Department
 Pasadena Police Department – S.W.A.T
 Passaic County Sheriff's Department – S.W.A.T
 Portland Police Bureau (PPB), Special Emergency Response Team, Portland, OR x 2 Bearcats, 1 Medcat
 Portland Port Authority (PPA), Special Emergency Response Team, Portland, OR x 2 Bearcats
 Prince William County Police Department SWAT
 Unified Police Department of Greater Salt Lake
 Riley County, KS Police Department
 San Diego Police Department (California) – S.W.A.T
 San Francisco Police Department – S.W.A.T
 Santa Barbara Police Department
 Seaside Police Department (California)
 Southeast Idaho SWAT team
 St. John the Baptist Parish Sheriff's Office – Crisis Management Unit (CMU)
 Stockton Police Department (California) – S.W.A.T
 York County (Pennsylvania) Quick Response Team
Walworth County Sheriff's Office (Wisconsin)
 Bellevue Police Department, Washington - SWAT
 Henry County, IN SWAT
Military
 United States Air Force 91st Security Forces Group
 United States Air Force Global Strike Command – (6) Air Force Bases – 60 BearCats for Nuclear Missile Convoy Protection
 Marine Corps Security Force Regiment
 United States Army BearCats used for US Army Military Police Special Reaction Teams
 Fort Carson, CO
 Fort Hood, TX
 Fort Riley, KS
 Fort Bragg, NC
 US Army, 94th MP BN Korea
 United States Navy SWFPAC & SWFLANT (Strategic Weapons Facilities / Pacific & Atlantic – Over 100 BearCats for Perimeter Patrol & Security)

References

External links 

 Lenco Bearcat official site
 Just the Facts!: The BearCat: What it is and what it is not!
 Leno's Garage: Lenco BearCat

Armoured cars of the United States
Military vehicles of the United States
Police vehicles
Military light utility vehicles
Military vehicles introduced in the 2000s